Mathias Michael Schubert (born 19 October 1966) is a German physicist, J. A. Woollam Distinguished Professor of Electrical and Computer Engineering at the University of Nebraska-Lincoln, and member of the Nebraska Center for Materials and Nanoscience. He is a specialist in spectroscopic ellipsometry and has contributed to the development of blue and white LED, fast processors and efficient biological and chemical sensors. He is also visiting professor at Linkoping University and Associate Editor of the journal Applied Physics Letters.

Early life and education 
Schubert was born in Jena, Thuringia, Germany. He graduated high school in 1986 with vocational education as tool and die maker from the Keramische Werke in Hermsdorf, Thuringia. After military service he studied physics at the University of Leipzig until 1994. He received a fellowship from the German Merit Foundation in 1995 for his doctoral research. In 1997 after earning his PhD he moved to the University of Nebraska-Lincoln, where he worked on infrared ellipsometry developments for characterization of semiconductors. After return to the University of Leipzig he obtained his habilitation in 2003 in experimental physics.

Research and Career 
In 2000, Schubert was appointed Assistant Professor (Habilitant, C1) at University of Leipzig, where he founded the Ellipsometry group. In 2005 Schubert was founding member of the German Association of Ellipsometry (Paul Drude e.V.). In 2005 Schubert was appointed associate professor at the University of Nebraska-Lincoln, where he founded the Complex Materials Optics Network. In 2012 he became Full professor. Schubert's research focuses on broad spectral range optical characterization of organic and inorganic materials. He invented and developed spectroscopic generalized ellipsometry broadly for characterization of arbitrarily anisotropic materials. His research team invented the optical Hall effect for noncontact measurement of the charge carrier mass in semiconductor materials and thin film heterojunctions. The generalized ellipsometry concept permits analysis of optical properties of materials with all crystal classes, particularly with low symmetry such as orthorhombic, monoclininc, and triclinic. Schubert developed a general concept for modeling the optical properties of low-symmetry materials, the eigendielectric polarization model. In 2022, he demonstrated measurement of the magnetic susceptibility tensor in electron paramagnetic resonance using terahertz ellipsometry and was part of a team describing a new form of coupled phonon photon states in low-symmetry materials.

Awards and honors 

 1995 Fellowship of the German Merit Foundation (Studienstiftung des Deutschen Volkes)
 2002 Fellowship of the Swedish Foundation for International Cooperation in Research and Higher Education (STINT)
 2006 Ludwig-Genzel Prize
 2011 Elected Fellow of the American Physical Society
 2014 Named Fellow of the Leibniz Institute for Polymer Research Dresden
 2015 Honorary Doctor of Technology, Linköping University
 2016 Visiting professor Linkoping University
 2017 J. A. Woollam Distinguished Professorship of Electrical and Computer Engineering, in honor of John Woollam

Publications 

Schubert has published 338 articles, book chapters, and books, gathering more than 11,400 citations, according to Google Scholar.

References 

Academic staff of Leipzig University
German electrical engineers
German expatriates in the United States
Fellows of the American Physical Society
20th-century German engineers
Leipzig University alumni
21st-century German engineers
University of Nebraska–Lincoln faculty
Scientists from Jena
Engineers from Thuringia
1966 births
Living people